Glen(n) Brown may refer to:

Glenn Brown (architect) (1854–1932), American architect and historian
Glenn Brown (artist) (born 1966), British artist
Glen Brown (–2019), Jamaican reggae musician
Glen Brown (footballer) (born 1962), Australian rules footballer
Glen E. Brown (born 1943), American politician in Utah